Václav Marek (born 16 March 1981) is a Czech football goalkeeper.

External links
 

Czech footballers
1981 births
Living people
Association football goalkeepers
Czech First League players
Bohemians 1905 players
1. FC Slovácko players
People from Kolín District
Sportspeople from the Central Bohemian Region